The largest prehistoric animals include both vertebrate and invertebrate species. Many of them are described below, along with their typical range of size (for the general dates of extinction, see the link to each). Many species mentioned might not actually be the largest representative of their clade due to the incompleteness of the fossil record and many of the sizes given are merely estimates since no complete specimen have been found. Their body mass, especially, is largely conjecture because soft tissue was rarely fossilized. Generally the size of extinct species was subject to energetic and biomechanical constraints.

Non-mammalian synapsids (Synapsida)

Caseasaurs (Caseasauria) 

Edaphosaurids (Edaphosauridae) 

Sphenacodontids (Sphenacodontidae) 
The largest members of the genus Dimetrodon were also the world's first fully terrestrial apex predators.

Tappenosauridae 

Therapsids (Therapsida)

Anomodonts (Anomodontia) 

Dinocephalians (Dinocephalia) 

Another enormous dinocephalian was the Late Permian Eotitanosuchus (a possible synonym to Biarmosuchus).

Gorgonopsians (Gorgonopsia) 

Therocephalians (Therocephalia) 
The largest of therocephalians is Scymnosaurus, which reached a size of the modern hyena.

Non-mammalian cynodonts (Cynodontia) 
 The largest known non-mammalian cynodont is Scalenodontoides, a traversodontid, which had a maximum skull length of approximately  based on a fragmentary specimen. 
 Paceyodon davidi was the largest of morganucodontans, cynodonts close to mammals. It is known by a right lower molariform  in length, which is bigger than molariforms of all other morganucodontans. 
 The largest known docodont was Castorocauda, almost  in length.

Mammals (Mammalia)

Non-therian mammals

Gobiconodonts (Gobiconodonta) 

The largest gobiconodont and the largest well-known Mesozoic mammal was Repenomamus. With such parameters it surpassed in size several small theropod dinosaurs of the Early Cretaceous.

Multituberculates (Multituberculata) 
The largest multituberculate Taeniolabis taoensis is the largest non-therian mammal known, at a weight possibly exceeding .

Monotremes (Monotremata) 

 The largest known monotreme (egg-laying mammal) ever was the extinct long-beaked echidna species known as Murrayglossus, known from a couple of bones found in Western Australia.
 The largest known ornithorhynchid is Obdurodon tharalkooschild, it was even larger than -long Monotrematum sudamericanum. 
 Kollikodon was likely the largest monotreme in Mesozoic.

Metatherians (Metatheria) 

 The largest non-marsupial metatherian was Thylacosmilus, weigh , one estimate suggesting even .
 Stagodontid mammal Didelphodon was one of the largest Mesozoic metatherians and all Cretaceous mammals.

Marsupials (Marsupialia) 
 The largest known carnivorous marsupial was Thylacoleo carnifex. Measurements taken from a number of specimens show they averaged  in weight.
Some species from the genus Sthenurus were similar in size or a bit larger than the extant grey kangaroo (Macropus giganteus).

Non-placental eutherians

Cimolestans (Cimolesta) 
Wortmania and Psittacotherium from the group Taeniodonta were among the largest mammals of the Early Paleocene. Lived as soon as half a million years after K–Pg boundary, Wortmania reached  in body mass. Psittacotherium, which appeared two million years later, reached .

Leptictids (Leptictida) 
The largest leptictid ever discovered is Leptictidium tobieni from the Middle Eocene of Germany.

Even-toed ungulates (Artiodactyla) 

 The largest of Bovinae as well as the largest bovid was Bison latifrons. The kouprey (Bos sauveli), reaching  in shoulder height, has existed since the Middle Pleistocene and is also considered to be possibly extinct.
 The long-legged Megalotragus is possibly the largest known alcelaphine bovid, bigger than the extant wildebeest.

 The largest camelid was Titanotylopus from the Miocene of North America. The Syrian camel (Camelus moreli) was twice as big as the modern camels.

Cetaceans (Cetacea) 

 
 Some Neogene rorquals were comparable in size to modern huge relatives. Some balaenopterids perhaps rivaled the blue whale in terms of size, though other studies disagree that any baleen whale grew that large in the Miocene.

Odd-toed ungulates (Perissodactyla) 

 The largest known perissodactyl, and the second largest land mammal (see Palaeoloxodon namadicus) of all time was the hornless rhino Paraceratherium.
 Some prehistoric horned rhinos also grew to large sizes. Such parameters make it the largest rhino of the Quaternary.
 Metamynodon, an amynodontid, reached  in length, comparable to Hippopotamus in measurement and shape.
 One of the biggest chalicotheres was Moropus.
 Late Eocene perissodactyls from the family Brontotheriidae attained huge sizes. Embolotherium from Asia was equal in size.
 The largest prehistoric horse was Equus giganteus of North America. Megahippus is another large anchitheriine. With the body mass of  it was much heavier than most of its close relatives.

Phenacodontids (Phenacodontidae) 
The largest known phenacodontid is Phenacodus.

Dinoceratans (Dinocerata) 
Despite their large size, Eobasileus as well as Uintatherium had a very small brain.

Carnivores (Carnivora)

Caniformia 

 The largest terrestrial mammalian carnivore and the largest known bear, as well as the largest known mammalian land predator of all time, was Arctotherium angustidens, the South American short-faced bear. The extinct cave bear (Ursus spelaeus) was also heavier than many recent bears. Ailuropoda baconi from the Pleistocene was larger than the modern giant panda (Ailuropoda melanoleuca).
Only the modern males of elephant seals (Mirounga) reaches the similar sizes.
 One of the largest of prehistoric otariids is Thalassoleon, comparable in size to the biggest extant fur seals.
 The biggest known mustelid to ever exist was likely the giant otter, Enhydriodon. Megalictis was the largest purely terrestrial mustelid (although Enhydriodon had recently been mentioned as the largest mustelid that also happens to be a terrestrial predator). Similar in size to the jaguar, Megalictis ferox had even wider skull, almost as wide as of the black bear. Megalictis had a powerful bite force, allowing it to eat large prey and crush bones, as modern hyenas and jaguars can. Another large-bodied mustelid was the superficially cat-like Ekorus from the Miocene of Africa. At almost , the long-legged Ekorus was about the size of a wolf and filling a similar to leopards ecological niche before big cats came to the continent. Other huge mustelids include Perunium and hypercarnivorous Eomellivora, both from the Late Miocene.
 The heaviest procyonid was possibly South American Chapalmalania.
The largest wolf (Canis lupus) subspecies ever existed in Europe is the Canis lupus maximus from the Late Pleistocene of France. Its long bones are 10% larger than those of extant European wolves and 20% longer than those of C. l. lunellensis. The Late Pleistocene Italian wolf was morphometrically close to C. l. maximus.

Feliformia 

 The largest nimravid was probably Quercylurus major as its fossils suggest it was similar in size to the modern-day brown bear and was scansorial.
 The biggest saber-toothed cats are Amphimachairodus kabir and Smilodon populator, with the males possibly reaching  and  respectively. Another contender for the largest felid of all time is Machairodus. Xenosmilus was also a huge cat.
 Some extinct feline felids also surpassed their modern relatives in size. The Eurasian giant cheetah (Acinonyx pardinensis) reached , approximately twice as large as the modern cheetah. The North American Pratifelis was larger than the extant cougar.
It is actually a subspecies of the African spotted hyena, which is at 10% smaller than the extinct cave hyena.
 The percrocutid feliform, Dinocrocuta, was two or even three times as large as the extant spotted hyena, .

Hyaenodonts (Hyaenodonta) 

Oxyaenids (Oxyaenidae) 

Mesonychians (Mesonychia) 
Some mesonychians reached a size of a bear. Such large were Mongolonyx from Asia and Ankalagon from North America. Another large mesonychian is Harpagolestes with a skull length of a half a meter in some species.

Bats (Chiroptera) 
Such proportions make it the largest vampire bat that ever evolved.

Hedgehogs, gymnures, shrews, and moles (Eulipotyphla) 

Rodents (Rodentia) 

 Several of the extinct South American dinomyids were much bigger than the modern rodents. Josephoartigasia monesi was the largest-known rodent of all time, approximately weighing an estimated .
 The largest beaver was the giant beaver (Castoroides) of North America.

Rabbits, hares, and pikas (Lagomorpha) 

Primates (Primates) 

 During the Pleistocene, some archaic humans were close in sizes or even larger than early modern humans. A tibia from Kabwe (Zambia) indicates an indeterminate Homo individual of possibly  in height. It was one of the tallest humans of the Middle Pleistocene and noticeably large even compared to recent humans.
It exceeds the maximum weight record of the chacma baboon, the largest extant baboon.
 The largest omomyids were Macrotarsius and Ourayia from the Middle Eocene. Both reached  in weight.
 Some prehistoric lemuriform primates grew to huge sizes as well. Other estimates suggest  but its still much larger than any extant lemur.

Elephants, mammoths, and mastodons (Proboscidea) 

Columbian mammoths had very long tusks.
 The largest mammutid was the Neogene Mammut borsoni.
 Deinotherium was the largest proboscidean in Deinotheriidae family.

Sea cows (Sirenia) 
The weight of Steller's sea cows is estimated to be .

Arsinoitheres (Arsinoitheriidae) 

The largest known arsinoitheriid was Arsinoitherium. A. giganteum reached even larger size than A. zitteli.

Hyraxes (Hyracoidea) 
Some of the prehistoric hyraxes were extremely large compared to modern small relatives. The largest hyracoid ever evolved is Titanohyrax ultimus. More recent Gigantohyrax was three times as large as the extant relative Procavia capensis, although it is noticeably smaller than earlier Megalohyrax and Titanohyrax.

Desmostylians (Desmostylia) 

Armadillos, glyptodonts and pampatheres (Cingulata) 

Anteaters and sloths (Pilosa) 

Several other sloths grew to large sizes as well, such as Eremotherium, but none as large as Megatherium.

Astrapotherians (Astrapotheria) 

Litopterns (Litopterna) 
The largest known litoptern was Macrauchenia, which had three hoofs per foot.

Notoungulates (Notoungulata) 
The largest notoungulate known of complete remains is Toxodon.

Pyrotherians (Pyrotheria) 

Reptiles (Reptilia)

Lizards and snakes (Squamata) 

 Giant mosasaurs are the largest-known animals within the Squamata. Another large mosasaur is Hainosaurus bernardi (could be synonymous to Tylosaurus).
The largest viper as well as the largest venomous snake ever recorded is Laophis crotaloides from the Early Pliocene of Greece. Another huge fossil viper is indeterminate species of Vipera. With a length of around  it was one of the biggest predators of Mallorca during the Early Pliocene.
As extant relatives, megalania could have been venomous and in that case this lizard was also the largest venomous vertebrate ever evolved. However, maximum size of this animal is subject to debate.

Turtles, tortoises and close relatives (Pantestudines)

Cryptodira 
Psephophorus terrypratchetti from the Eocene attained  in body length.
 The largest trionychid ever recorded is indeterminate specimen GSP-UM 3019 from the Middle Eocene of Pakistan.

Side-necked turtles (Pleurodira) 

Macrobaenids (Macrobaenidae) 
The largest macrobaenids were the Early Cretaceous Yakemys, Late Cretaceous Anatolemys, and Paleocene Judithemys. All reached  in carapace length.

Meiolaniformes 

The largest meiolaniid was Meiolania.

Sauropterygians (Sauropterygia)

Placodonts and close relatives (Placodontiformes) 

Nothosaurs and close relatives (Nothosauroidea) 

Plesiosaurs (Plesiosauria) 

 The largest known plesiosauroid was an indeterminate specimen possibly belonging to Aristonectes (identified as cf. Other large plesiosauroids are Styxosaurus and Elasmosaurus. Hydralmosaurus (previously synonymized with Elasmosaurus and Styxosaurus) reached  in total body length.

 There is much controversy over the largest-known of the Pliosauroidea. Pliosaurus funkei (also known as "Predator X") is a species of large pliosaur, known from remains discovered in Norway in 2008. This species is, however, claimed to be a juvenile and has been attacked by a larger pliosaur. Some media sources claimed that Monster of Aramberri was a Liopleurodon but its species is unconfirmed thus far. Another very large pliosaur was Pliosaurus macromerus, known from a single  incomplete mandible.

Proterosuchids (Proterosuchidae) 

Erythrosuchids (Erythrosuchidae) 

Phytosaurs (Phytosauria) 

Non-crocodylomorph pseudosuchians (Pseudosuchia) 

 
 The largest shuvosaurid and one of the largest pseudosuchian from the Triassic period was Sillosuchus. Biggest specimens could have reached  in length.
It is both the largest "rauisuchian" known to science, and the largest non-dinosaurian terrestrial predator ever discovered. A specimen of Prestosuchus discovered in 2010 suggest that this animal also reached lengths of nearly  making it one of the largest Triassic pseudosuchians.

Crocodiles and close relatives (Crocodylomorpha)

Aegyptosuchids (Aegyptosuchidae) 
The Late Cretaceous Aegisuchus is the main contender for the title of the largest crocodylomorph ever recorded.

Crocodylians (Crocodylia) 
According to another information, maximum estimate measure  and almost  in length and in weight respectively. Another giant caiman was Mourasuchus.
 The basal crocodyloidean Astorgosuchus bugtiensis from the Oligocene was large.
It is not only the largest mekosuchian (some studies reject it from this group) but also it could have been Australia's largest Pliocene predator.

Paralligatorids (Paralligatoridae) 

Tethysuchians (Tethysuchia) 
 Some extinct pholidosaurids reached giant sizes.

Stomatosuchids (Stomatosuchidae) 

Notosuchians (Notosuchia) 

Thalattosuchians (Thalattosuchia) 

 Plesiosuchus was very large metriorhynchid. With the length of  it exseeded even some pliosaurids of the same time and locality such as Liopleurodon.

Basal crocodylomorphs 
Redondavenator was the largest Triassic crocodylomorph ever recorded, with a skull of at least  in length.

Pterosaurs (Pterosauria) 

Yet another possible contender for the title is Cryodrakon which had a  wingspan.
Only a fragmentary rhamphorhynchid specimen from Germany could be larger (184% the size of the biggest Rhamphorhynchus).

Choristoderes (Choristodera) 

Tanystropheids (Tanystropheidae) 

Thalattosaurs (Thalattosauria) 

Ichthyosaurs (Ichthyosauria) 

In April 2018, paleontologists announced the discovery of a previously unknown ichthyosaur that may have reached lengths of  making it one of the largest animals known, rivaling some blue whales in size. Another, larger ichthyosaur was found in 1850 in Aust. Its remains seemed to surpass the measurements of the other ichthyosaur, but the researchers commented that the remains were too fragmentary for a size estimate to be made.

Tangasaurids (Tangasauridae) 

Pareiasaurs (Pareiasauria) 
Such sizes had Middle Permian Bradysaurus, Embrithosaurus, and Nochelesaurus from South Africa, and the Late Permian Scutosaurus from Russia. The most robust Scutosaurus had  in body mass.

Captorhinids (Captorhinidae) 

Non-avian dinosaurs (Dinosauria)

Sauropodomorphs (Sauropodomorpha) 
The largest of non-sauropod sauropodomorphs ("prosauropod") was Euskelosaurus.

Sauropods (Sauropoda) 

 A mega-sauropod, Maraapunisaurus fragillimus (previously known as Amphicoelias fragillimus), is a contender for the largest-known dinosaur in history. Unfortunately, the fossil remains of this dinosaur have been lost.
 Known from the incomplete and now disintegrated remains, the Late Cretaceous Bruhathkayosaurus matleyi was an anomalously large sauropod. More accurate estimation suggests  and  but it still much heavier than most other sauropods.

Xinjiangtitan shanshanesis from the same family had -long neck, about 55% of its total length that could be at least .
 The Middle Jurassic Breviparopus taghbaloutensis was mentioned in The Guinness Book of Records as the longest dinosaur at  although this animal is known only from fossil tracks.

Asiatosaurus could reach  in height but this animal is known only from teeth.

Giant sauropods like Supersaurus, Sauroposeidon, and Diplodocus probably rivaled them in length but not in weight.

Many large sauropods are still unnamed and may rival the current record holders:
 The "Archbishop", a large brachiosaur that was discovered in 1930. The animal was reported to get a scientific paper published by the end of 2016.
 Brachiosaurus nougaredi is yet another large brachiosaur from Early Cretaceous North Africa. The remains have been lost, but the sacrum drawing remains.
 In 2010, the femur of a large sauropod was discovered in France. The femur suggests an animal that grew to immense sizes.

Non-avian theropods (Theropoda) 

Some other notable giant theropods (e.g. Carcharodontosaurus, Acrocanthosaurus, and Mapusaurus) may also have rivaled them in size.
It is assigned to oviraptorosaurs like Beibeilong.

Armoured dinosaurs (Thyreophora) 

Pachycephalosaurs (Pachycephalosauria) 
The largest pachycephalosaur was the eponymous Pachycephalosaurus.

Ceratopsians (Ceratopsia) 

Pentaceratops and several other ceratopsians rival them in size.

Ornithopods (Ornithopoda) 

Magnapaulia reached  in length, or, according to original description, even .
 The largest ornithopod outside of Hadrosauroidea was likely the Iguanodon.

Birds (Aves) 

The largest known birds of all time might have been the elephant birds of Madagascar. Nearly the same size was the Australian Dromornis stirtoni (see below).

Enantiornitheans (Enantiornithes) 

Avisauridae 

The Late Cretaceous Avisaurus was almost as large as Enantiornis. Even larger could be the Soroavisaurus. Mirarce was comparable in size to a turkey, much larger than most of other enantiornitheans.

Pengornithidae 

Gargantuaviidae 
Gargantuavis is the largest known bird of the Mesozoic, a size ranging between the cassowary and the ostrich, and a mass of  like modern ostriches.

Dromornithiformes 

Gastornid (Gastornithiformes) 

Waterfowl (Anseriformes) 

Another huge anseriform was the flightless New Zealand goose (Cnemiornis). It reached , approaching in size to small species of moa.

Swans (Cygnini) 
The giant Annakacygna yoshiiensis from the Miocene of Japan was much bigger than the extant mute swan.

Anatinae 
Finsch's duck (Chenonetta finschi) reached  in weight, surpassing related modern Australian wood duck.

Pelicans, ibises and allies (Pelecaniformes) 
The Early Pliocene Pelecanus schreiberi was larger than most extant pelicans.

Storks and allies (Ciconiiformes) 

Cranes (Gruiformes) 
A huge true crane (Gruinae) from the late Miocene (Tortonian) of Germany was equal in size to the biggest extant cranes and resembled the long-beaked Siberian crane (Leucogeranus leucogeranus).

Shorebirds (Charadriiformes) 

Hesperornithines (Hesperornithes) 

New World vultures (Cathartiformes) 

One of the heaviest flying bird ever was Argentavis from the family Teratornithidae. Argentavis humerus was only slightly shorter than an entire human arm. Even with lower estimates, it was larger than the observed California condor (Gymnogyps californianus) of nowadays.

Seriemas and allies (Cariamiformes) 

Accipitriforms (Accipitriformes) 

Another giant extinct hawk was Titanohierax about  that lived in the Antilles and The Bahamas, where it was among the top predators. An unnamed late Quaternary eagle from Hispaniola could be 15–30% larger than the modern golden eagle (Aquila chrysaetos). Some extinct species of Buteogallus surpassed their extant relatives in size. Buteogallus borrasi was about 33% larger than the modern great black hawk (B. urubitinga). B. daggetti, also known as "walking eagle", was around 40% larger than the savanna hawk (B. meridionalis). Eyles's harrier (Circus eylesi) from the Pleistocene-Holocene of New Zealand was more than twice heavier than the extant C. approximans.

Moa (Dinornithiformes) 
The tallest known bird was the South Island giant moa (Dinornis robustus), part of the moa family of New Zealand that went extinct about 500 years ago.

Tinamous (Tinamiformes) 
MPLK-03, a tinamou specimen that existed during the Late Pleistocene in Argentina, possibly belongs to the modern genus Eudromia and surpacces extant E. elegans and E. formosa in size by 2.2-8% and 6-14%, respectively.

Elephant birds (Aepyornithiformes) 
The largest bird in the fossil record may be the extinct elephant birds (Vorombe, Aepyornis) of Madagascar, which were related to the ostrich.

Ostriches (Struthioniformes) 
With  in body mass, Pachystruthio dmanisensis from the lower Pleistocene of Crimea was the largest bird ever recorded in Europe. Despite its giant size, it was a good runner. Remains of the massive asian ostrich (Struthio asiaticus) from the Pliocene indicate a size 20% bigger than adult male of the extant Struthio camelus.

Pigeons and doves (Columbiformes) 
 

Pheasants, turkeys, gamebirds and allies (Galliformes) 

The largest known of the Galliformes was likely the giant malleefowl, which could reach  in weight.

Songbirds (Passeriformes) 

Cormorants and allies (Suliformes) 

Grebes (Podicipediformes) 

Bony-toothed birds (Odontopterygiformes) 
The largest known of the Odontopterygiformes— a group which has been variously allied with Procellariiformes, Pelecaniformes and Anseriformes and the largest flying birds of all time other than Argentavis were the huge Pelagornis, Cyphornis, Dasornis, Gigantornis and Osteodontornis. Exact size estimates and judging which one was largest are not yet possible for these birds, as their bones were extremely thin-walled, light and fragile, and thus most are only known from very incomplete remains.

Woodpeckers and allies (Piciformes) 

Parrots (Psittaciformes) 
The largest known parrot is the extinct Heracles inexpectatus with a length of about 1 meter (3.3 feet).

Penguins (Sphenisciformes) 

One of the heaviest known penguin ever known is Kumimanu fordycei, body mass estimate based on humerus results . Other largest penguins, such as cf. Another large penguin is Anthropornis nordenskjoeldi of New Zealand and Antarctica.

Owls (Strigiformes) 

Amphibians (Amphibia) 

Lissamphibians (Lissamphibia)

Frogs and toads (Anura) 

The Late Cretaceous Beelzebufo grew to at least  (snout-vent length), which is around the size of a modern African bullfrog.

Salamanders, newts and allies (Urodela) 

 Habrosaurus was the largest sirenid.

Diadectomorphs (Diadectomorpha) 

Anthracosauria 

Embolomeri 

The longest member of this group was Eogyrinus attheyi, species sometimes placed under genus Pholiderpeton.

Temnospondyls (Temnospondyli) 

Fishes (Pisces) 
Fishes are a paraphyletic group of non-tetrapod vertebrates.

Jawless fish (Agnatha)

Conodonts (Conodonta) 

Heterostracans (Heterostraci) 

Thelodonts (Thelodonti) 

Cephalaspidomorphs (Cephalaspidomorphi) 

Spiny sharks (Acanthodii) 
The largest of the now-extinct Acanthodii was Xylacanthus grandis, an ischnacanthiform based on a ~ long jaw bone.

Placoderms (Placodermi) 

The largest known placoderm was the giant predatory Dunkleosteus. Its filter feeding relative, Titanichthys, may have rivaled it in size.

Cartilaginous fish (Chondrichthyes)

Mackerel sharks (Lamniformes) 

 Species in the extinct genus Otodus were huge. A giant shark, Otodus megalodon is by far the biggest mackerel shark ever known. Due to fragmentary remains, there have been many contradictory size estimates for megalodon, as they can only be drawn from fossil teeth and vertebrae. Related to megalodon, Otodus angustidens and O. chubutensis reached the large sizes too.
 Other giant mackerel sharks were Pseudoscapanorhynchidae from the Cretaceous period.
 The heaviest thresher shark was likely Alopias grandis. It was similar in size or even larger than the extant great white shark and probably did not have an elongated dorsal tail, characteristic of modern relatives.

Ground sharks (Carcharhiniformes) 
The Cenozoic Hemipristis serra was considerably larger than its modern-day relatives and had much larger teeth.

Hybodonts (Hybodontiformes) 

Skates and allies (Rajiformes) 

Eugeneodont (Eugeneodontida) 

The largest known eugeneodont is an as-yet unnamed species of Helicoprion discovered in Idaho. The specimens suggest an animal that possibly exceeded  in length. Another fairly large eugeneodont is Parahelicoprion. Both had the largest sizes among the animals of Paleozoic era.

Lobe-finned fish (Sarcopterygii)

Coelacanths (Actinistia) 

An undetermined mawsoniid from the Maastrichtian deposits of Morocco probably reached  in length.

Lungfish (Dipnoi) 

Stem-tetrapods (Tetrapodomorpha) 

Ray-finned fish (Actinopterygii)

Pachycormiformes 

Ichthyodectiformes 

Pycnodontiformes 

Bichirs (Polypteriformes) 
The Late Cretaceous Bawitius was likely the largest bichir of all time.

Opahes, ribbonfishes, oarfishes and allies (Lampriformes) 
Megalampris was likely the largest fossil opah.

Salmon and trout (Salmoniformes) 

Pufferfishes, boxfishes, triggerfishes, ocean sunfishes and allies (Tetraodontiformes) 

Lizardfishes (Aulopiformes) 

Echinoderms (Echinodermata)

Crinozoa

Sea lilies (Crinoidea) 

Asterozoa

Starfish (Asteroidea) 

Graptolites (Graptolithina) 
It found in Silurian deposits of the United Kingdom.

Kinorhynchs (Kinorhyncha) 
Cambrian kinorhynchs from Qingjiang biota, also known as "mud dragons", reached  in length, much larger than extant relatives that grow only a few millimeters in length.

Arthropods (Arthropoda)

Dinocaridida

Gilled lobopodians 

Based on the findings of mouthparts, the Cambrian gilled lobopodian Omnidens amplus is estimated to have been . It is also known as the largest Cambrian animal known to exist.

Radiodont (Radiodonta) 

Chelicerata

Sea spiders (Pycnogonida) 

Horseshoe crabs and allies (Xiphosura) 

 Willwerathia reached  in carapace width and was the largest species of basal ("synziphosurine") xiphosurans.
 Horseshoe crab trackway icnofossil Kouphichnium lithographicum from Cerin in Ain indicates length of animal .

Chasmataspidids (Chasmataspidida) 

Eurypterids (Eurypterida) 

Erettopterus grandis possibly reached this same length but this is based on an incomplete telson only. The largest megalograptid as well as the largest Ordovician eurypterid was Pentecopterus. All these were eurypterine eurypterids.

Arachnids (Arachnida) 
 There are three contenders for largest-known arachnid as well as the largest scorpions of all time: Pulmonoscorpius kirktonensis, Brontoscorpio anglicus and Praearcturus gigas.
Dinodiplura ambulacra had larger body length, combined length of carapace and opisthosoma reaches .
 The largest of prehistoric whipscorpions and possibly the largest-known whipscorpion ever discovered was Mesoproctus.

Artiopods (Artiopoda) 

Trilobites (Trilobita) 
Some of these extinct marine arthropods exceeded  in length. Fragments of trilobites suggest even larger record sizes.

Myriapods (Myriapoda) 

The largest known myriapod by far was Arthropleura.

Non-hexapod crustaceans (Crustacea)

Cycloids (Cyclida) 

Remipedes (Remipedia) 

Insects (Insecta)

Sawflies, wasps, bees, ants and allies (Hymenoptera) 

 Apis lithohermaea is one of the largest honey bees ever found, comparable in size to the modern Apis dorsata.
 The giant horntail Ypresiosirex orthosemos reached  in length including the incomplete ovipositor.

Fleas (Siphonaptera) 

Earwigs (Dermaptera) 

Chresmodidae 
Chresmodidae had long specialized legs like of the modern Gerridae family.

Beetles (Coleoptera) 
One of the largest known fossil beetles in the superfamily Scarabaeoidea is Protognathinus spielbergi.

Titanopterans (Titanoptera) 

Related to modern orthopterans, titanopterans from the Triassic period were much larger.

Antlions and related net-winged insects (Neuroptera) 

Cockroaches, termites, mantises and allies (Dictyoptera) 

 Some Carboniferous cockroach-like insects grouping in Blattoptera like Archoblattina beecheri and Necymylacris (Xenoblatta) scudderi could reach around 9 centimetres in total length, which is comparable to a modern Megaloblatta longipennis.

Dragonflies, damselflies and griffinflies (Odonatoptera) 

Mayflies (Ephemeroptera) 

Palaeodictyoptera 
If subcircular wing known from Piesberg Quarry belongs to palaeodictyopteran, it possibly had single wing length at least .

Archaeognatha (jumping bristletails) and other wingless primitive insects 

 The largest specimens of the extinct suborder Monura reached  or more, not counting the length of the filament.
 Although Ramsdelepidion was once considered as -long silverfish, it was later considered that classification is uncertain and just treated as stem group insect.
 Wingless early insect Carbotriplura had body length about  without tail filaments.

Ringed worms (Annelida) 

Molluscs (Mollusca)

Snails and slugs (Gastropoda) 

Bivalves (Bivalvia) 

Another large prehistoric bivalve was Inoceramus. In 1952, -long specimen of Inoceramus steenstrupi was found in the Late Cretaceous deposits of Greenland.

Tusk shells (Scaphopoda) 

Cephalopods (Cephalopoda)

Nautiloids (Nautiloidea) 
There is a record of individual whose shell length had reached , but it is doubtful.

Ammonites (Ammonoidea) 
The largest known ammonite was Parapuzosia seppenradensis.

Belemnites (Belemnoidea) 

Squids, octopuses, cuttlefishes and allies (Neocoleoidea) 

 Both non-octopod Yezoteuthis and teuthid Haboroteuthis are estimated to be similar in size to the modern-day giant squid.

Brachiopods (Brachiopoda) 

Titanaria costellata had large and long shell  in width, nearly as large as Gigantoproductus.

Hyoliths (Hyolitha) 

Cnidarians (Cnidaria)

Jellyfishes and allies (Medusozoa) 
Specimens from the Cambrian of Wisconsin reached  in length.

Vendobionts (Vendobionta)

Petalonamids (Petalonamae) 

Longest specimens of Trepassia wardae (also known as Charnia wardi) reached  in length.

Proarticulata 
Dickinsonia tenuis reached  in length, that makes it one of the largest precambrian organisms.

Sponges (Porifera) 

See also 
 Dinosaur size
 Largest organisms
 Megafauna

References

Sources

External links 

Lists of prehistoric animals
Prehistoric